Amanda Toni "Mandy" Loots (born 3 August 1978 in Gwelo, Rhodesia) is an Olympic and national-record-holding swimmer from South Africa.

Swimming career
Loots swam for South Africa at the 1996, 2000 and 2008 Olympics.

Despite being of South African nationality she won the ASA National British Championships over 100 metres butterfly and the 400 metres medley in 1999.

At the 1999 All-Africa Games, she was South Africa's most decorated athlete at the Games, winning 6 gold medals. In November 2009, she set the African Record and South African Record in the short-course (25m) 200 fly.

She has swum for South Africa at the:
Olympics: 1996, 2000, 2008
Commonwealth Games: 1994, 2002, 2006
All-Africa Games: 1999, 2007
African Swimming Championships: 2008, 2010

References

1978 births
Living people
Sportspeople from Gweru
Afrikaner people
Zimbabwean emigrants to South Africa
South African people of Dutch descent
Olympic swimmers of South Africa
Swimmers at the 1996 Summer Olympics
Swimmers at the 2000 Summer Olympics
Swimmers at the 2008 Summer Olympics
Swimmers at the 1994 Commonwealth Games
Swimmers at the 2002 Commonwealth Games
Swimmers at the 2006 Commonwealth Games
Commonwealth Games medallists in swimming
Commonwealth Games silver medallists for South Africa
African Games gold medalists for South Africa
African Games medalists in swimming
African Games silver medalists for South Africa
Competitors at the 2011 All-Africa Games
Medallists at the 2002 Commonwealth Games